Quasieulia is a genus of moths belonging to the family Tortricidae.

Species
Quasieulia endela (Walsingham, 1914)
Quasieulia hirsutipalpis (Walsingham, 1914)
Quasieulia jaliscana Razowski & Brown, 2004
Quasieulia mcguffini Powell, 1986

See also
List of Tortricidae genera

References

 , 1986, Pan-Pacif. Ent. 62: 392
 , 2005, World Catalogue of Insects 5

External links
tortricidae.com

Euliini
Tortricidae genera